Maile O'Keefe (born February 26, 2002) is an American artistic gymnast. She was a member of the U.S. National Team and is the 2016 and 2017 U.S. Junior National Champion.  She currently competes for the University of Utah's NCAA gymnastics team and is a 2x NCAA champion.

Early life
O'Keefe was born on February 26, 2002, to Matthew and Tori Lynn O'Keefe in Las Vegas, Nevada.  She has three siblings, Paige, Caitlin & Dylan.  She completed high school through Odyssey Charter School, graduating a year early in 2019.

Gymnastics career

Junior

2013
In 2013, O'Keefe, then eleven, was a level 9 gymnast. She attended a developmental camp at the Karolyi Ranch where she earned the opportunity to compete at an elite qualifier. At the qualifier, she performed at a high enough level where she was qualified to Junior Elite status, bypassing level 10 completely.

2014–16 
O'Keefe competed at various domestic meets.  She finished 13th and 17th at the 2014 and 2015 National Championships respectively.  She encountered breakthrough during the 2016 season, where she won the all-around title in the Junior division at the 2016 U.S. National Gymnastics Championships, in addition to the beam and floor titles too.

2017
In March, O'Keefe competed at International Gymnix in Canada where she placed first in the all-around and finished top three on every event. In April, she participated in the 2017 City of Jesolo Trophy. In Jesolo she finished second in the all-around behind Gabby Perea. O'Keefe also won bronze medals in the uneven bars and balance beam finals, as well as a silver medal in the floor exercise final.  In June O'Keefe announced that she had verbally committed to attend the University of Utah on a gymnastics scholarship.  In August, she won the all-around at the 2017 U.S. National Gymnastics Championships. She along with silver medalist Emma Malabuyo were selected to represent the USA at the 2017 International Junior Gymnastics Competition the following month in Japan.  There O'Keefe won gold in the all-around and on beam and silver on floor, vault, and uneven bars.

Senior

2018
In February 2018, O'Keefe was named as the wildcard athlete for the 2018 American Cup.  In her senior international debut, O'Keefe finished third with a score of 54.365, behind fellow American Morgan Hurd and Mai Murakami of Japan. In the spring O'Keefe underwent wrist surgery to fix a ganglion cyst. She spent the remainder of the year recovering.

Level 10

2019
In early 2019, O'Keefe announced that she had dropped back down to level 10.  Her first meet was at the Brestyan’s Las Vegas Invitational in February.  After the meet she announced that she received early admission to the University of Utah and would be competing with their gymnastics program in the 2019–2020 season.

NCAA
O'Keefe signed her National Letter of Intent with the University of Utah in March 2019.  She joined Abby Paulson, Jillian Hoffman, and Jaedyn Rucker as the freshmen class of the 2019–2020 season.

2019–2020 season
O'Keefe made her NCAA debut in a meet against the Kentucky Wildcats where she competed on vault, uneven bars, and balance beam to help Utah win 196.425 to 195.350.  She made her all-around debut at the inaugural Best of Utah meet against BYU, Southern Utah, and Utah State, where she helped Utah win and individually she placed third in the all-around.

2020–2021 season
In a meet against defending national champions the Oklahoma Sooners, O'Keefe competed all four events.  Although Utah lost, O'Keefe claimed the all-around and balance beam titles with scores of 39.550 and 9.95 respectively.  She was subsequently named as the Pac-12 gymnast of the week.  The following week in a meet against Arizona O'Keefe only competed on vault, uneven bars, and balance beam.  She received the highest score, a 9.90, on the latter two events.

On January 30, in a meet against Washington, O'Keefe earned her first perfect 10, achieving this score on the balance beam.  Additionally she won the all-around with a score of 39.525.  As a result O'Keefe was named as the Pac-12 gymnast of the week for the second time this season.

After the regular season concluded, O'Keefe was announced as the Pac-12 Gymnast of the Year.  In March O'Keefe competed at the Pac-12 Conference Championships.  She helped Utah finish first while individually winning the all-around title and co-winning the uneven bars, balance beam, and floor exercise titles.

In April O'Keefe competed at the NCAA Championships.  She competed all four events for Utah and finished 11th in the all-around after having minor issues on the balance beam.  However she finished first on both the uneven bars (tied with Maya Bordas of California) and on floor exercise (tied with Lexi Graber of Alabama and Anastasia Webb of Oklahoma).  Additionally she helped Utah advance to the team finals.  During the team finals O'Keefe recorded the highest balance beam and uneven bars scores of the day and helped Utah place third.

2021–2022 season 
O'Keefe competed at the Best of Utah meet where she competed on only the uneven bars and balance beam to help Utah win.  She put up the highest uneven bars score of the night, a 9.875.  On January 29, in a meet against Stanford, O'Keefe earned her second career perfect ten on the balance beam.  As a result she was named Pac-12 gymnast of the week.

O'Keefe was named Pac-12 specialist of the year.  At the Pac-12 Championships O'Keefe helped Utah win their second consecutive team title.  Individually she placed third in the all-around behind Jade Carey and teammate Grace McCallum.

Career perfect 10.0

Competitive history

References 

2002 births
American female artistic gymnasts
Level 10 gymnasts
Living people
Sportspeople from Las Vegas
U.S. women's national team gymnasts
Utah Red Rocks gymnasts
NCAA gymnasts who have scored a perfect 10